James "Jim" Munkley MBE (January 8, 1949 – October 3, 2017) was a former Welsh para table tennis player, he had participated in five Summer Paralympic Games.

After his retirement from sport in 2008, Munkley became a voluntary coach and trained Claire Robertson for the 2008 Summer Paralympics.

References

1949 births
2017 deaths
Welsh male table tennis players
Paralympic table tennis players of Great Britain
Medalists at the 1984 Summer Paralympics
Table tennis players at the 1984 Summer Paralympics
Table tennis players at the 1988 Summer Paralympics
Table tennis players at the 1992 Summer Paralympics
Table tennis players at the 1996 Summer Paralympics
Table tennis players at the 2000 Summer Paralympics
Paralympic medalists in table tennis
Paralympic bronze medalists for Great Britain
Welsh Paralympic competitors
Members of the Order of the British Empire
Table tennis coaches